Peter Benjamin Hauser (20 April 1934 – 9 March 2000) played professional football for Blackpool before becoming player-manager of Chester in 1963. This made him one of the first foreign managers in English football.

A wing-half, former underground surveyor Hauser made 83 English Football League appearances (scoring 10 goals) for Blackpool between 1955 and 1962, before dropping out of professional football and joining Cheltenham Town.

Following the departure of Bill Lambton, 29-year-old Hauser took over as manager of Chester shortly before the 1963–64 season got underway. Chester had endured very little success since the Second World War but Hauser set about improving the club's fortunes. A mid-table finish in Division Four in his first season represented progress after three successive re-election applications, before steering the club through an amazing 1964–65. The club scored 119 league goals and a further 22 in the two main cup competitions, with all five regular forwards scoring at least 20. Hauser was a regular throughout the season, which saw Chester finish just 8th despite their goal glut.

The 1965–66 campaign saw Chester finish 7th, after looking favourites for promotion before full back namesakes Ray and Bryn Jones both suffered broken legs against Aldershot on New Year's Day. Chester's fortunes began to decline after this and, after struggling in 1966–67 (after which Hauser stopped playing), things got worse a year later. A home defeat to fellow strugglers Workington on 17 February 1968 brought to an end Hauser's five years in charge, and his association with professional football in England.

After leaving Chester, Hauser returned to South Africa to resume his underground surveying career.

References

1934 births
2000 deaths
People from Kimberley, Northern Cape
South African soccer players
Association football wing halves
Blackpool F.C. players
Cheltenham Town F.C. players
Addington F.C. players
Chester City F.C. players
Highlands Park F.C. players
English Football League players
South African soccer managers
Chester City F.C. managers
English Football League managers
Corinthians F.C. (Johannesburg) players